= WUDO (AM) =

Radio station in Lewisburg, Pennsylvania

WUDO (1010 AM) was a radio station located in Lewisburg, Pennsylvania, which broadcast from November 21, 1957, to April 25, 1975. Its license was deleted on September 22, 1975.
